Ákos Füzi dr. (born 24 March 1978) is a retired Hungarian football player who currently works as a club manager for Újpest FC. He spent most of his career playing for MTK Hungária FC. He made a guest appearance (bending the rules to their fullest extent) to appear for the Budapest team in the 2004 Lawyers World Cup (Mundiavocat) held in Balaton region, Hungary. His involvement proved key, as it was his penalty kick (scored from rebound after initial shot saved) that enabled Budapest to overcome London 1–0 to progress to the tournament final, which they won.

Füzi retired from playing in April 2008.

Honours
Hungarian League: 2003
Hungarian Super Cup: 2003

References

External links
Nemzeti Sport profile 
Profile on ftcbk.eu 

1978 births
Living people
Hungarian footballers
Hungary youth international footballers
Hungary under-21 international footballers
Hungary international footballers
Hungarian expatriate footballers
Győri ETO FC players
Ferencvárosi TC footballers
Újpest FC players
MTK Budapest FC players
Vasas SC players
FC Admira Wacker Mödling players
Nemzeti Bajnokság I players
Austrian Football Bundesliga players
Expatriate footballers in Austria
Association football fullbacks